Kosmos 2232 ( meaning Cosmos 2232) is a Russian US-K missile early warning satellite which was launched in 1993 as part of the Russian Space Forces' Oko programme. The satellite is designed to identify missile launches using optical telescopes and infrared sensors.

Kosmos 2232 was launched from Site 16/2 at Plesetsk Cosmodrome in Russia. A Molniya-M carrier rocket with a 2BL upper stage was used to perform the launch, which took place at 15:55 UTC on 26 January 1993. The launch successfully placed the satellite into a molniya orbit. It subsequently received its Kosmos designation, and the international designator 1993-006A. The United States Space Command assigned it the Satellite Catalog Number 22321.

See also

List of Kosmos satellites (2251–2500)
List of R-7 launches (1990–1994)
1993 in spaceflight
List of Oko satellites

References

Kosmos satellites
Spacecraft launched in 1993
Oko
Spacecraft launched by Molniya-M rockets